The Advertising Standards Authority (ASA) is an organisation that investigates breaches of advertising standards in New Zealand. The ASA provides a free complaints process for consumers about the content and placement of advertisements. In assessing complaints, the ASA apply the ASA Advertising Codes. Key requirements of these codes include truthful presentation and a sense of social responsibility. If a complaint is upheld, the ASA formally request the advertisement is removed or amended. Decisions are released to the media and the public via email and online.

The ASA began when the Committee of Advertising Practice was established in 1973 by the Newspaper Publishers Association, the NZ Broadcasting Commission and the Accredited Advertising Agencies Association. The name was changed to the Advertising Standards Authority and it was incorporated in 1990. It now has 14 member organisations representing advertisers, agencies and the media.

In 2008 there is a total of $2.3 billion spent on advertising in New Zealand. These advertisements attracted 671 complaints to the ASA with 153 being upheld or settled. Of the remainder 140 were not upheld, 317 were judged as lacking grounds to proceed and 61 were withdrawn.

ASA Objectives
The three main objectives are: 
To seek to maintain at all times and in all media a proper and generally acceptable standard of advertising and to ensure that advertising is not misleading or deceptive, either by statement or by implication.
To establish and promote an effective system of voluntary self-regulation in respect to advertising standards.
To establish and fund an Advertising Standards Complaints Board.

Advertising Standards Complaints and Appeal Board
The Advertising Standards Complaints Board (ASCB) is a nine-member board, with five public members and four industry members. The ASCB addresses complaints made by members of the public against ASA Advertising Codes.

The Advertising Standards Complaints Appeal Board (ASCAB) is a three-member Board that addresses appealed ASCB complaints.

References

External links
Advertising Standards Authority

Business organisations based in New Zealand
Mass media in New Zealand
Advertising regulation
Advertising in New Zealand
Advertising organizations
Regulation in New Zealand